Body Wishes is the twelfth studio album by Rod Stewart released in 1983 by Warner Bros. Records. The tracks were recorded and mixed at The Record Plant, Los Angeles.  It produced three singles, "Baby Jane", "What Am I Gonna Do (I'm So in Love with You)", and "Sweet Surrender". The cover is a tribute to the cover of the Elvis Presley album, 50,000,000 Elvis Fans Can't Be Wrong.

Critical reception

Body Wishes has received poor reviews. Rolling Stone magazine, at the time of its release, gave it 2 out of 5 stars, calling it "his latest and surely one of his least", although they did praise the opening song, "Dancin' Alone", calling it "a Chuck Berry-styled Rock & Roller that is both lively and witty". 
Stephen Thomas Erlewine of AllMusic retrospectively gave the album 1.5 out of 5 stars, calling it "one of Rod Stewart's worst efforts." In the same review, "Baby Jane" and "What Am I Gonna Do (I'm So in Love with You)" are described as "first-rate, synth-laden pop/rock filler" only sounding "substantial" in comparison to the other songs on the album.

Track listing

Personnel
Rod Stewart – lead vocals, backing vocals
Jim Cregan – guitar, Backing vocals
Robin Le Mesurier – guitar
Jay Davis – bass guitar, backing vocals
Tony Brock – drums, electronic drums
Kevin Savigar – synthesizer, piano
Tommy Vig – percussion
Jimmy Zavala – saxophone, harmonica
Technical
Kosh - art director, designer

Charts

Weekly charts

Year-end charts

Certifications

References

Rod Stewart albums
1983 albums
Albums produced by Tom Dowd
Albums recorded at Record Plant (Los Angeles)
Warner Records albums